{{DISPLAYTITLE:C23H32O6}}
The molecular formula C23H32O6 (molar mass: 404.50 g/mol, exact mass: 404.2199 u) may refer to:

 Hydrocortisone acetate
 k-Strophanthidin

Molecular formulas